Sri Lankan English (SLE) is the English language as it is used in Sri Lanka, a term dating from 1972. Sri Lankan English is principally categorised as the Standard Variety and the Nonstandard Variety, which is called as "Not Pot English". The classification of SLE as a separate dialect of English is controversial. English in Sri Lanka is spoken by approximately 23.8% of the population (2012 est.), and widely used for official and commercial purposes. Sri Lankan English being the native language of approximately 5400 people thus challenges Braj Kachru's placement of it in the Outer Circle. Furthermore, it is taught as a compulsory second language in local schools from grade one to thirteen, and Sri Lankans pay special attention on learning English both as children and adults. It is considered even today that access and exposure to English from one's childhood in Sri Lanka is to be born with a silver spoon in one's mouth.

The British colonial presence in South Asia led to the introduction of English to Sri Lanka. Since 1681, some words have been borrowed from Sinhala and Tamil by English. In 1948, Ceylon gained independence from the United Kingdom, and English was no longer the only official language. In subsequent years, inequality in access to education and national conflict have confounded the development and the use of SLE, particularly in Sri Lankan literature. SLE varies from British or American English in elements such as colloquialisms, vocabulary, syntax, pronunciation and emphasis of syllables. SLE generally favours British spellings ("colour", "programme", "analyse," and "centre") over American spellings ("color", "program", "analyze," and "center"). SLE also favours the British "Q Before P" rule (i.e., ".) over the reverse (i.e., .")

Sri Lankan words in English 
Sri Lankan words that were borrowed by the English and are used in the language are recorded in A Historical Relation of the Island Ceylon in the East Indies. Such words often relate to flora and fauna:
 anaconda
 betel
 rattan
 wanderoo

Attitudes 
Having taken root in Sri Lanka (then Ceylon) in 1796, Sri Lankan English has gone through over two centuries of development. In terms of its socio-cultural setting, Sri Lankan English can be explored largely in terms of different stages of the country's class and racial tension, economy, social disparity and postwar rehabilitation and reconciliation. For instance, the country witnessed a general lowering in the standard of English following the Sinhala Only Act that was introduced in 1956. English as a medium of education in schools were dropped, and the Act also prompted the emigration of the predominantly English-speaking Burgher community of Sri Lanka. That resulted in the Sinhala language gaining more prominence in all domains of Sri Lanka, but its influence on Sri Lankan English also increased. In fact, the merging of the two languages resulted in a so-called "Singlish", which remains a significant feature of Sri Lankan English.

That period was followed by the 1970s revival of an open-market economy, the increased exposure to foreign media and the internet, a rising expatriate community and the growth of English-medium "international schools" The Sri Lankan government also recognised the importance of English not only as a life skill needed to maintain contact with the outside world but also as a necessary link language in a country that is home to several cultures and ethnicities.

Just like the other languages spoken in Sri Lanka, Sri Lankan English has also come to have its own classifications of both regional and class dialects. According to one study, it was found that colloquial features and pronunciations that distinguish Sri Lankan English from the standard form is highly influenced by the country's mother tongue. One such example is its notably-large number of Sinhalese loanwords used. There are also many loanwords borrowed from Tamil, Malay, Arabic, Dutch and Portuguese languages.

Moreover, it is hard to point out an exact number of Sri Lankan English speakers. A relatively-small portion of Sri Lankans, namely the Colombo elite, considers English its first language. That community arguably makes up a prominent part of Sri Lanka's social, cultural, political and commercial circles.

Additionally, just like any other language, SLE is constantly evolving with the new generation. That is particularly noticeable when one compares the English used by older generations who spoke a more "colonial" English that was highly influenced by the British during and after independence. Despite such changes, the question of what constitutes a standard form of Sri Lankan English remains unanswered. Within certain social circles, the term "Sri Lankan English" is closely referred to a form of "broken" English, which is not spoken fluently. However, others disagree with that notion and acknowledges that SLE is a valid form.

In spite of its wide usage, many English-speakers do not acknowledge the existence of the Sri Lankan variety of English. In terms of class distinctions, the so-called Colombo elite of the "Colombo 07" families of Sri Lanka consider English to be their first language, and the variety of English spoken by them is considered to be closer to the international standard of English. However, the further one goes from the main areas of Colombo, the greater is the influence of Sinhalese and Tamil on the English that is spoken there, with varying degrees of bilingualism.

Colloquialisms 
Colloquialisms have emerged in SLE. Some involve vocabulary. Others involve grammar (such as tense and plurals), syntax and intonation.

Vocabulary

Grammar 
Words and tags may be added, subtracted, overused, or changed in order and tense in SLE.

Pronunciation 

Speakers of Sri Lankan English have varying ability to produce certain sounds. However, these sounds were adapted to Sinhalese alphabet, (e.g., ෆ, fa), thus many Sri Lankans experience no trouble in proper pronunciation of these sounds.

Syncope occurs, as it does in many other languages. For example, "exercise" and "conversation" may be pronounced "excise" and "conversion".

Additionally, some differences in pronunciation may relate to socioeconomic background and level of education. For example, a word like "note" is pronounced with a diphthong, in standard English. In SLE, it is pronounced  with the monophthong;  and is accepted as normal in Sri Lanka. However, pronouncing a word like "hall" as * is not accepted. The non-standard variety "Not Pot English" is formed based on the variant pronunciations of /o/ and /ɔ/ sounds by the Sri Lankan speakers. The confusion between full and half /o/ sounds is noted as a class marker; the label "Not Pot" itself reflects this mispronunciation. Confused words for Sri Lankan speakers include hall and hole, ball and bowl, and phone and call. Examples of some other words pronounced with a monophthong include "take" and "made", "cake" and "rake", and "go" and "no".

Those unfamiliar with English may add an involuntary /i-/ prior to words like "skill" and "smell". However, this is not standard in SLE.

Other features 
Some elided syllables in English are pronounced in SLE. For example, "different" would be pronounced "diff-er-ent" and "basically" would be pronounced "bay-si-cal-ly". Also, some syllables normally unstressed and sounded as /ə/ may be sounded as /a(ː)/ (or, /o/, /u/, /e/ or /i/). For example, the word "camera" may become .

In SLE, the first syllable may be emphasised rather than the usual second or third. Examples include "address", "cassette", "dessert", "museum", "hotel" and "gazette". One may also see differences in the allocation of primary and secondary syllable stresses. However, in SLE, usual British English pronunciations are favored over American English pronunciations.

Major Publications 
 The Postcolonial Identity of Sri Lankan English by Manique Gunesekera
 A Dictionary of Sri Lankan English by Michael Meyler

See also 
 Regional accents of English speakers

References

External links 
 Hussein P. Dictionary of Sri Lankan English. Self-published and sold at Mirisgala website. Accessed 30 January 2014.
 A brief history of Sri Lankan English Newsletter article at (archived) Oxford English Dictionary website.
 An Historical Relation of the Island Ceylon in the East Indies Project Gutenberg.
 A review of Knox's Words Sunday Observer, Sri Lanka. 15 August 2004.
 Knox's Words. Ondaatje website.
 Our British heritage Sunday Observer, Sri Lanka. 3 February 2002.
Sri Lankan English (SLE) Vocabulary: A New Vocabulary in a New Variety of English. Article in a journal on OUSL website.

E
Dialects of English